The Kinoshita–Lee–Nauenberg theorem or KLN theorem states that perturbatively the standard model as a whole is infrared (IR) finite. That is, the infrared divergences coming from loop integrals are canceled by IR divergences coming from phase space integrals.

An analogous result for quantum electrodynamics alone is known as Bloch–Nordsieck theorem.

Ultraviolet divergences in perturbative quantum field theory are dealt with in renormalization.

References

Taizo Muta, Foundations of Quantum Chromodynamics: An Introduction to Perturbative Methods in Gauge Theories, World Scientific Publishing Company; 3 edition (September 30, 2009)

Standard Model
Quantum field theory
Theorems in quantum mechanics